100 Queen's Gate Hotel London, Curio Collection by Hilton  is a historic 228-room hotel, part of the Curio Collection by Hilton, situated in the Royal Borough of Kensington and Chelsea, within close proximity of Hyde Park. The hotel features three food and beverage venues: W/A Kensington, an all-day brasserie and bar offering British-French fusion cuisine; Botanica, housed in a botanical glasshouse, designed for afternoon teas and cocktails; and ESQ bar.

History

Originally built in 1870 as the home of Victorian aristocrat William Alexander, the building was later used as a hospital in the 1960s. A private hotel was first established on the site as early as 1908. In 1974, the building was converted to The Regency Hotel.
 
The building was renovated by Agenda 21 Architects Studio Ltd and finished by Jan 2013. The project included full refurbishment of the existing hotel to new interior design, including full remodeling of the guest rooms, bathrooms and reception areas. Done in several phases in order to retain operation.

From December 17, 2015 the hotel operated as DoubleTree by Hilton Hotel London - Kensington. On March 31, 2019 it became part of Hilton's Curio brand.

The hotel has been listed as a Grade II building since 15 Apr 1969.

References

External links
100 Queen's Gate Hotel official website
100 Queen's Gate Hotel London, Curio Collection by Hilton official chain website
Agenda 21 Architects Studio

Hotels in London
Hilton Worldwide
Hilton Hotels & Resorts hotels
Grade II listed buildings in the Royal Borough of Kensington and Chelsea
Hotels established in 1974
Hotel buildings completed in 1870